Lawless Cowboys is a 1951 American Western film directed by Lewis D. Collins and written by Maurice Tombragel. The film stars Whip Wilson, Fuzzy Knight, Jim Bannon, Lee Roberts, Pamela Duncan and I. Stanford Jolley. The film was released on November 7, 1951, by Monogram Pictures.

Plot

Cast          
Whip Wilson as Whip Wilson
Fuzzy Knight as Horace Greeley Smithers
Jim Bannon as Jim Bannon
Lee Roberts as Cory Hanson
Pamela Duncan as Nora Clayton
I. Stanford Jolley as Sheriff 
Bruce Edwards as Bob Rank
Richard Avonde as Ace Malloy
Marshall Reed as Paul Maxwell
Pierce Lyden as Rusty 
Richard Emory as Jeff
Stanley Price as Joe

References

External links
 

1951 films
1950s English-language films
American Western (genre) films
1951 Western (genre) films
Monogram Pictures films
Films directed by Lewis D. Collins
American black-and-white films
1950s American films